The World Methodist Council (WMC), founded in 1881, is a consultative body and association of churches in the Methodist tradition. It comprises 80 member denominations in 138 countries which together represent an estimated 80 million people; this includes approximately 60 million committed members (of Methodist and united and uniting churches) and a further 20 million adherents. It is the fifth-largest Christian communion after the Roman Catholic Church, Eastern Orthodox Church, Anglican Communion, and World Communion of Reformed Churches (see list of denominations by membership).

Affiliated organizations are the World Fellowship of Methodist and Uniting Churches, the Oxford-Institute of Methodist Theological Studies, the World Methodist Historical Society, World Council of Confederation of Methodist Youth, the World Council of Methodist Men, World Methodist Council of Teens, the World Federation of Methodist and Uniting Church Women.

World Methodist Conference
The highest organ of the World Methodist Council is the World Methodist Conference, which meets every five years. The next Conference, the 22nd, will be held in Gothenburg, Sweden in 2024.

The 21st Conference was held in 2016 in Houston, Texas in the United States. The theme was "ONE". Organized around four sub themes – One God, One Faith, One People, One Mission.

The 2011 conference, gathered under the theme "Jesus Christ - for the Healing of the Nations", was held in August 2011 in Durban, South Africa. On 24 July 2006, Sunday Mbang stepped down as chairperson of the council and John Barrett took over his position as well as elected president for the council.

In 2006, it formally approved the Joint Declaration on the Doctrine of Justification.

World Methodist Council officers
Current officers are:
 General secretary: Bishop Ivan M. Abrahams
 President: Bishop JC Park
 Vice-President: Gillian Kingston
 Treasurer: Kirby Hickey
 Youth and young adult coordinator: John Thomas III
The World Methodist Council has offices in Waynesville, North Carolina; Nashville, Tennessee; New York City; and Atlanta, Georgia.

Activities

Continuous activities 
The World Methodist Council has eight standing committees:
 Ecumenics and Dialogue is engaged in ecumenical dialogue with the Roman Catholic Church, the Anglican Communion, the Lutheran World Federation, the Salvation Army and the World Alliance of Reformed Churches. It is also working towards a dialogue with the Eastern Orthodox Church and with certain Pentecostal churches.
 Education is concerned with education in churches and with Methodist educational institutions. It has organized an international Association of Methodist Schools, Colleges, and Universities promoting quality and value-centered education. The association links representatives from over 700 Methodist related schools and colleges all over the world.
 Evangelism is coordinating worldwide evangelism efforts of Methodist churches
 Family Life is concerned with applying Christian values to issues like relationships in marriage, rights of children, rights of the aged, prevalence of violence and changing roles of women and men in society;
 Social and International Affairs is focusing currently on economic justice or injustice. It has worked out the World Methodist Social Affirmation which was approved in 1986 and is part of the literature of several Methodist denominations.
 Theological Education focuses on training for ministry based on basic Christian beliefs and distinctive emphases from the Wesleyan tradition.
 Worship and Liturgy encourages the study of liturgy and forms of worship, especially issues as language and culture, corporate and private worship, music and liturgy, cultural influences, and balancing Christian tradition with local emphasis. Develops hymnals and resources.
 Youth and Young Adults focuses on empowering young people, taking its motto from 1st Timothy 4;12 and Ephesians 4:12–13: "Don't let anyone look down on you because you are young, but set and example for the believers in speech, in life, in love, in faith and in purity. To equip the saints for the work of ministry, for building up the body of Christ, until all of us come to the unity of the faith and of the knowledge of the son of God, to maturity, to the measure of the full stature of Christ."

Peace award
The World Methodist Peace Award is the highest honor bestowed by Methodists around the world. Since 1977, it is given annually by the World Methodist Council. This award is given to individuals or groups "who have made significant contributions to peace, reconciliation and justice".

Recipients of the World Methodist Peace Award include Habitat for Humanity International, Nelson Mandela, Jimmy Carter, Boris Trajkovski, former President of Macedonia; the Community of Sant'Egidio in Rome, and the Grandmothers of the Plaza de Mayo in Argentina.

Evangelism institute
One ministry of the World Methodist Council is the World Methodist Evangelism Institute in Atlanta, Georgia. It is an educational institution committed to the task of world evangelization and connected to a major university, Candler School of Theology, Emory University.

Former headquarters and museum
In the 1950s, area residents and Methodists from the Southeastern United States raised money for the construction of a building in Lake Junaluska, North Carolina to attract the World Methodist Council headquarters. Until the 1970s, the museum building was to go to the Lake Junaluska Assembly if no longer needed, although that plan was changed. The Royce and Jane Reynolds Headquarters building, intended to resemble the house where John Wesley lived when he was young, was added in the 1990s after a donation from the Reynolds family. The museum housed letters written by Wesley, a pulpit Wesley used, and a 1594 Geneva Bible, as well as ancient items from the Holy Land. Starting in 2013, with the museum having problems, the sale of the building was considered but the assembly made no formal offer. The COVID-19 pandemic finally made closing the museum necessary, and its contents went to Bridwell Library of Perkins School of Theology, Southern Methodist University in Dallas, Texas. In Spring 2021, the World Methodist Council sold its headquarters building, including a museum, to the assembly for $1.25 million. The World Methodist Council moved to offices in nearby Waynesville, North Carolina.

At a Lake Junaluska Board of Trustees meeting in March 2022, Lake Junaluska Executive Director Ken Howle announced a $1.1 million gift from Anne and Mike    Warren, who also gave $625,000 toward the purchase of the headquarters building and part of the Susanna Wesley Garden next door. The gift from the Warrens helped with $2.5 million in renovations to what is now called the Warren Center, for smaller group events.

See also

 List of Methodist denominations
 List of the largest Protestant denominations

References

Notes

Bibliography
 Statement on "Wesleyan/Methodist Witness In Christian and Islamic Cultures" 2004
 Brochure World Evangelism Emphasis, 2004

External links 
 
 World Methodist Evangelism
 World Methodist Evangelism Institute
 World Methodist Peace Award

International bodies of Protestant denominations
Methodist denominations established in the 19th century
Methodist organizations
Religious organizations established in 1881